Cnodontes bouyeri is a butterfly in the family Lycaenidae. It is found in the Democratic Republic of the Congo (Shaba). Its habitat consists of woodland.

References

Butterflies described in 1994
Poritiinae
Endemic fauna of the Democratic Republic of the Congo